The 1963 National Football League draft was held at the Sheraton in Chicago, Illinois, on Monday, December 3, 1962.

The first overall selection was quarterback Terry Baker of Oregon State, the Heisman Trophy winner, taken by the Los Angeles Rams. The AFL draft was held two days earlier in Dallas.

Player selections

Round one

Round two

Round three

Round four

Round five

Round six

Round seven

Round eight

Round nine

Round ten

Round eleven

Round twelve

 4 Signed with the Buffalo Bills of the American Football League.

Round thirteen

Round fourteen

Round fifteen

Round sixteen

Round seventeen

Round eighteen

Round nineteen

Round twenty

Hall of Famers
 Bobby Bell, linebacker from Minnesota taken 2nd round, 16th overall by the Minnesota Vikings.
Inducted: Professional Football Hall of Fame class of 1983.
 Buck Buchanan, defensive tackle from Grambling taken 19th round, 265th overall by the New York Giants.
Inducted: Professional Football Hall of Fame class of 1990.
 John Mackey, tight end from Syracuse taken 2nd round, 19th overall by the Baltimore Colts.
Inducted: Professional Football Hall of Fame class of 1992.
 Jackie Smith, tight end from Northwestern State taken 10th round, 129th overall by the St. Louis Cardinals.
Inducted: Professional Football Hall of Fame class of 1994.
 Dave Robinson, linebacker from Penn State taken 1st round, 14th overall by the Green Bay Packers.
Inducted: Professional Football Hall of Fame class of 2013.
 Willie Brown, cornerback from Grambling State, signed undrafted by Houston Oilers. 
Inducted: Professional Football Hall of Fame class of 1984.
 Winston Hill, offensive tackle from Texas Southern taken 11th round, 145th overall by the Baltimore Colts.
Inducted: Professional Football Hall of Fame class of 2020.

Notable undrafted players

See also
 1963 American Football League draft

References

External links
 NFL.com – 1963 Draft
 databaseFootball.com – 1963 Draft
 Pro Football Hall of Fame

National Football League Draft
Nfl Draft, 1963
Draft
NFL Draft
NFL Draft
1960s in Chicago
American football in Chicago
Events in Chicago